Sturla Sighvatsson (1199 – 21 August 1238) was an Icelandic chieftain or goði of the Sturlungar family clan who played an active role in the armed conflicts in Iceland during the Age of the Sturlungs (Icelandic: Sturlungaöld).

Sturla was the son of Sighvatur Sturluson, brother of saga-writer Snorri Sturluson and lived on a farmstead in Sauðafell. Like his uncle, Sturla became a vassal to King Haakon IV of Norway, and fought to extend his influence in Iceland. Sturla was killed in the Battle of Örlygsstaðir.

See also 
 Sauðafell Raid

References 

1199 births
1238 deaths
12th-century Icelandic people
13th-century Icelandic people
Military personnel killed in action
Sturlungar family clan
Goðar